Madras Legislative Council was expanded by the Indian Councils Act of 1892. The Act increased the number of additional members of the Council to a maximum of 20, of whom not more than nine had to be officials. The Act introduced the method of election for the Council, but did not mention word "election" explicitly. The elected members were officially called as "nominated" members and their method of election was described as "recommendation". Such "recommendations" were made by district boards, universities, municipalities and other associations. The term of the members was fixed at two years. The Council could also discuss the annual financial statement and ask questions subject to certain limitations. Thirty eight Indian members were "nominated" in the eight elections during 1893–1909 when this Act was in effect. C. Jambulingam Mudaliar, N. Subba Rao Pantulu, P. Kesava Pillai and C. Vijayaraghavachariar representing southern group of district boards, Kruthiventi Perraju Pantulu of the northern group of municipalities, C. Sankaran Nair and P. Rangaiah Naidu from the Corporation of Madras and P. S. Sivaswami Iyer, V. Krishnaswamy Iyer and M. Krishnan Nair from the University of Madras were some of the active members. However, over a period of time, representation by Indian members dwindled, for example, the position of Bashyam Iyengar and Sankaran Nayar in 1902 was occupied by G L Acworth and Sir G. M. J. Moore.

List of members
This is the list of the official and non-official members of the Madras Legislative Council between 1891 and 1909. The number of members in the Council at a given point of time may vary due to differing appointment dates of the individual members.

See also
Madras Legislative Council, 1861-1891

References

Tamil Nadu Legislative Council